Guaporé may refer to:

Guaporé River in Brazil/Bolivia
Guaporé, Rio Grande do Sul in Brazil
The former name of Rondônia